Alimata Salembéré (born 1942) is a Burkinabe film administrator, civil servant and politician. She was a founding member of the film festival FESPACO, and served as its General Secretary from 1982 to 1984. She was a Minister of Culture in Burkina Faso from 1987 to 1991.

Life
Alimata Salembéré was born November 9, 1942 in Bobo-Dioulasso. After gaining a BA in modern literature and a professional degree in television production, she started working for Radio Télévision du Burkina. She was a co-founder of FESPACO in 1969, and president of its first organizing committee.

From 1976 to 1980 Salembéré was a press officer at the African and Malagasy Common Organization (OCAM). From 1982 to 1984 she was secretary general of FESPACO, and from 1983 to 1986 she was press secretary at the Burkina Faso Embassy in Paris. She was appointed secretary general of the Ministry of Information from 1986 to 1987, and Minister of Culture from 1987 to 1991. From 1992 to 1999 she was Director General of the Agency of Cultural and Technical Cooperation (ACCT).

References

1942 births
Living people
Burkinabé journalists
Burkinabé film people
Government ministers of Burkina Faso
Culture ministers of Burkina Faso
Women government ministers of Burkina Faso
21st-century Burkinabé people